The Scroll and Its Combinations is the third studio album by the American rock band Wellwater Conspiracy. It was released on May 22, 2001, through TVT Records.

Overview
The album was recorded in 2000 at Space Studio in Seattle, Washington. The album was mixed by the band and Adam Kasper. Pearl Jam vocalist Eddie Vedder (credited as Wes C. Addle) provides vocals on "Felicity's Surprise". Former Soundgarden guitarist Kim Thayil helped with some of the songs on the album. Former Soundgarden bass guitarist Ben Shepherd, who was the former vocalist for Wellwater Conspiracy, played bass guitar on the song "Keppy's Lament". Chris Handyside of Rolling Stone said that "amid all the fuzz and minor chord bombast is an edgy, hard-rock post-millennial tension."

Track listing

Personnel

Wellwater Conspiracy
Matt Cameron – drums, vocals, guitars, keyboards, photography
John McBain – guitars, bass guitar, drums, keyboards

Additional musicians and production
Gerry Amandes – vocals on "What Becomes of the Clock"
Derek Burns – vocals on "Tidepool Telegraph" and "Tick Tock 3 O'Clock"
Paul Burback – additional vocals on "Tidepool Telegraph" and "Tick Tock 3 O'Clock"
Amy Denio – saxophone on "Tick Tock 3 O'Clock"
April Cameron – viola on "Tick Tock 3 O'Clock", "What Becomes of the Clock", and "Felicity's Surprise"
Justine Foy – cello on "Tick Tock 3 O'Clock", "What Becomes of the Clock", and "Felicity's Surprise"
Eddie Vedder – vocals on "Felicity's Surprise" (credited as "Wes C. Addle")
Kim Thayil – additional guitar on "C, Myself and Eye" and "The Scroll"
Ben Shepherd – bass guitar on "Keppy's Lament"
Gregg Keplinger – additional drums on "Keppy's Lament"
Bill Cameron – photography
Gary Arnett – layout design
Ed Brooks – mastering
Adam Kasper, Wellwater Conspiracy – mixing

Joe Greenwald - Management
Leonard B. Johnson - A&R Coordination

References

External links
The Scroll and Its Combinations information at nowinvisibly.com

2001 albums
TVT Records albums
Wellwater Conspiracy albums
Albums produced by Matt Cameron